Tess Lieder (née Wester, born 19 May 1993) is a Dutch handballer who plays as goalkeeper for the Dutch national team.

A full international with the Dutch national team since 2012, she won the silver medal in the 2015 World Women's Handball Championship with the Dutch team and became the goalkeeper with the highest percentage of saves in the tournament. Wester also reached fourth place with the Dutch team in the 2016 Summer Olympics.

Career
Wester started her career in 1999 at Hugo Girls, at the age of 5–6. In her youth career she also played for VZV and HandbalAcademie.

She played in the EHF Champions League with VOC Amsterdam in the 2008–09 season. Wester played in E&O Emmen since 2010 until 2011.

In 2011, she was signed for German club VfL Oldenburg, playing in the club until 2015 winning the German Cup in 2012. Wester was signed for Bundesliga club SG BBM Bietigheim. She won Bundesliga title with them and played in Champions League.

In 2018 she decided to take a step forward in her career and signed a contract with the ambitious Danish team, Odense Håndbold.

After her contract with Odense expired in 2021, she signed for Romanian club CSM București. She explained her decision was influenced by the fact that "CSM is a top team where expectations are high. That suits me well." as well as "This club not only wants to win the Champions League, but also has the experience to do so. ... I want to feel that trigger."

On the 21st of April 2022 it was announced that she informed her club, CSM about leaving at the end of the season with the intention of moving closer to her homeland. At the beginning of May 2022 she announced her pregnancy via Instagram.

International career
Wester played for the first time with the Dutch team in a friendly match against Romania on 2 October 2012.

She played in the 2015 World Women's Handball Championship with the Dutch team, achieving the final of the tournament, but losing against Norway 23–31.

She was called up for represent Netherlands handball team in the 2016 Summer Olympics, achieving the fourth place after losing in the semi-finals against France 23–24, and in the bronze medal match against Norway 26–36.

Honours
Club competitions
Romanian Cup:
Winner: 2022
Romanian Supercup:
Finalist: 2021
Damehåndboldligaen:Winner: 2021
Bundesliga:Winner: 2017
German Cup:Winner: 2012
National team
Youth World Championship:Bronze Medalist: 2010
Junior European Championship:Silver Medalist: 2011
World Championship:Gold Medalist: 2019Silver Medalist: 2015Bronze Medalist: 2017
European Championship:Silver Medalist: 2016Bronze Medalist'': 2018

Individual awards
 All-Star team Best Goalkeeper of the World Championship: 2015, 2019

Personal life
She is married to Dutch footballer Mart Lieder. In May 2022 it was announced that she is expecting her first child. She gave birth to a girl, Flo on 18 November 2022.

References

External links

1993 births
Living people
People from Heerhugowaard
Dutch female handball players
Expatriate handball players
Dutch expatriate sportspeople in Denmark
Dutch expatriate sportspeople in Germany
Handball players at the 2016 Summer Olympics
Olympic handball players of the Netherlands
Handball players at the 2020 Summer Olympics
Dutch expatriate sportspeople in Romania
Sportspeople from North Holland
21st-century Dutch women